Thounaojam Shyamkumar Singh is a politician from Manipur, India. He was minister of forest, horticulture, soil conservation and the department of municipal administration, housing & urban development (2017-2020) in the Biren Singh-led coalition government.

Career 

In 2002, he had contested the Manipur Legislative Assembly election as the Indian National Congress candidate in the Andro constituency, finishing third with 4513 votes.

In 2007 he was elected to the Legislative Assembly, as the Manipur People's Party candidate in the Andro constituency. Notably, he contested the elections whilst being in jail. He had been arrested in October 2006 at Indira Gandhi International Airport, Delhi, and was accused of being a member of Kanglei Yawol Kanna Lup and working as a liaison between KYKL and the United National Liberation Front.

In August 2007, he was elected Deputy Speaker of the Manipur Legislative Assembly.

In January 2017, Khoirom Ranjeet, the leader of the banned Kangleipak Communist Party, Poirei Meiti who was recently arrested for an extortion and kidnapping ring, was revealed to have links to Shayamkumar. One of the MLA's aides was said to have run the ring on behalf of Ranjeet, who is suspected of being involved in 11 different attacks on restaurants and hospitals in Manipur.

In 2017, he joined Bharatiya Janata Party and was made Minister of forest, horticulture, soil conservation and the department of municipal administration, housing & urban development in the Biren Singh-led coalition government.

In March 2020, Shyamkumar was disqualified as a legislator from the Manipur Legislative Assembly on the grounds of defection under the 10th schedule of the Constitution. A disqualification case against Shyamkumar was registered by the 15 Indian National Congress MLA's which included T. N. Haokip, Md Fazur Rahim and K. Meghachandra. Shyamkumar was elected on Indian National Congress ticket but allegiance to the Bharatiya Janata Party soon after.

References

Manipur MLAs 2007–2012
Indian National Congress politicians from Manipur
Living people
Deputy Speakers of the Manipur Legislative Assembly
Manipur politicians
Manipur Peoples Party politicians
Manipur MLAs 2017–2022
Bharatiya Janata Party politicians from Manipur
Year of birth missing (living people)
Trinamool Congress politicians
Manipur MLAs 2022–2027